is an original Japanese anime television series animated by Tatsunoko Production (under their Bakken Record label) and produced by Bushiroad.  The series aired from April to June 2021.

Plot
Joran is set in an alternate historical Japan, the 64th year of the Meiji era (1931 A.D.), where the shogun Tokugawa Yoshinobu continued to reign over Japan instead of handing over power to a Prime Minister. Despite this unexpected prosperity, the government is threatened by an insurgent group known as "Kuchinawa," which hates the isolationist policies of Tokugawa and aims to overthrow the Shogunate.
In response, the Tokugawa government has created "Nue," a secret police organization dedicated to rooting out Kuchinawa. Sawa Yukimura is orphaned after her family are murdered by Kuchinawa to obtain a quantity of their blue blood which has the ability to transform humans into "Changelings", demonic beasts associated with animals. She unwillingly becomes an assassin for Nue in the hope of seeking revenge on her family's murderers.

Characters

Publicly, Sawa is a 18-year-old young woman who runs a bookstore and cares for her adoptive sister Asahi. Privately though, she is a Nue executioner and the last surviving member of the Karasumori clan, her real name being Sawa Karasumori (烏森 咲羽, Karasumori Sawa). Possessing the power of the blue blood within her, Sawa is able to transform into a pureblooded Changeling when she fights, earning heightened vitality and superhuman powers. Her weapon of choice is a blade concealed in her parasol, and she has a white crow named Nana. 

A Nue executioner who specializes in seductive techniques. Publicly, she is a famous novelist and sex worker in the red-light district. Elena is notably free-spirited and prefers to live life passionately and wildly. Her weapons of choice are a whip and a crossbow concealed in a parasol.  

A Nue executioner who specializes in information gathering. Makoto identifies as a man and publicly poses as a bandoneon performer. He is level-headed and independent, with his own agenda outside of being an executioner. Makoto possesses a pessimistic view that everyone is placed into a set role throughout their lives. His weapon of choice is a lighted sword concealed in his cane.

A seven-year-old girl who Sawa took in during a mission for Nue. Asahi is conflicted towards Sawa, who is responsible for killing her parents, but also treats her like a younger sister. She makes up her mind to live peacefully with Sawa in the end and prevent her from killing anyone.

The leader of Nue and dedicated protector of the shogun. He found Sawa as she was burying her family, and then trained her to be a Nue executioner. His real name is Iori Makabe, and he holds Sawa in high regard despite her reluctance to be an executioner.

A young woman and Nue executioner who has no knowledge of her past or original identity. She underwent painful surgery to have 40 bands of oronium metal inserted into her body with which she can create razor sharp weapons. She is a heavy drinker, but is a functional drunk and is still able to operate under the influence of alcohol. She is tasked by Jin to maintain surveillance on Sawa.

He is the leader of the Kuchinawa, a group opposed to the rule of Tokugawa Yoshinobu, the shogun. He first worked for the shogun using the Karasumori clan's rare blue blood, performing inhuman experiments to create super beings. He then attempted to create artificial Changelings for his own benefit.

Production and release
On February 9, 2021, the anime original television series was announced in a press conference by Bushiroad. The series was animated by Tatsunoko Production (under their Bakken Record label) and directed by Susumu Kudou. Rika Nezu served as series composition writer, and co-wrote the scripts with Kunihiko Okada. Kano Komiyama designed the characters, and Michiru composed the series' music. It premiered on March 31, 2021 on streaming platforms and aired from April 7 to June 23, 2021 on NTV and other channels. Raise A Suilen performed the opening theme song "Exist" and the ending theme song "Embrace of Light". Crunchyroll has licensed this series for English release outside of Asia. Medialink has licensed the series in Southeast Asia and South Asia. Aniplus will release the series in South Korea.

Episode list

Notes

References

External links
Official website 

2021 anime television series debuts
Alternate history anime
Anime with original screenplays
Bushiroad
Crunchyroll anime
Medialink
Nippon TV original programming
Tatsunoko Production